The 1997 Mobil 1 British Rally Championship was won by Manxman Mark Higgins in the Nissan Sunny GTI ahead of fellow Manxman Martin Rowe in the Renault Megane Maxi Kit Car, Alister Mcrae in the Volkswagen Golf and Welshman Gwyndaf Evans in the Ford Escort. The manufacturers championship was won by Volkswagen ahead of Nissan and Renault.

Calendar

Teams and Drivers

References

British Rally Championship seasons
Rally Championship
British Rally Championship